Pynchon is an English surname. Notable people with the surname include:

 Thomas Pynchon (born 1937), American novelist
 George M. Pynchon (1862–1940), American yacht racer
 William Pynchon (1590–1662), English colonial settler and founder of Springfield, Massachusetts

See also 
 Pinchon
 Pyncheon

English-language surnames